Vittorio (or Vittore) Crivelli was an Italian painter, brother of Carlo Crivelli. Born ca. 1440 in Venice, dead in Venice 1501 or 1502. His works are similar in style to his brother's, but less accomplished.

There are examples of his work in the Metropolitan Museum of Art in New York, the El Paso Museum of Art, Texas, the Pinacoteca Brera in Milan, the Ashmolean Museum, Oxford, the Fitzwilliam Museum, Cambridge, the Musée du Petit Palais, Avignon or the Philadelphia Museum of Art. He painted a Madonna della Morte for a church in Massa Fermana, Marche.

External links
 "Virgin and Child enthroned", in the Fitzwilliam Museum, Cambridge.
"Enthroned Virgin and Child", in the Philadelphia Museum of Art
The Metropolitan Museum of Art online catalogue
The Pinacoteca Brera online catalogue
Vittore Crivelli at the Musée du Petit Palais on Joconde database
 Фильм "Vittorio Crivelli - художник итальянского Возрождения" (русский язык). 

15th-century Italian painters
Italian male painters
Crivelli, Vitorio
1440s births
1500s deaths